The 1981 Campeonato Brasileiro Série C, officially, the Taça de Bronze 1981, was the first edition of the Campeonato Brasileiro Série C.The championship was performed by 24 clubs. The first phase was disputed by a two-legged knockout tournament, in which the winners qualified to the Second phase, that was disputed in the same way. The winners qualified to the second phase, in which the six teams were divided into two groups of tree teams, that played against the teams of their own groups twice.the first-placed teams of each group qualified to the finals. The winner qualified to the Taça de Prata of the following year.

First stage

|}

Second phase

|}

Third phase

Group A

Group B

Finals

First leg

Second leg

References

Sources
 RSSSF

Campeonato Brasileiro Série C seasons
1981 in Brazilian football
B